Phoebe Waller-Bridge is an English actress and writer of the stage and screen.

She has received numerous awards for her work on television and on the stage as an actor, writer, and producer. She has received seven Primetime Emmy Award nominations, winning three times in 2019 for Outstanding Comedy Series, Outstanding Lead Actress in a Comedy Series, and Outstanding Writing for a Comedy Series for the second season of her critically acclaimed comedy series Fleabag on Amazon Video. She was also nominated for Outstanding Writing for a Drama Series in 2018 and Outstanding Drama Series in 2019 for the BBC spy thriller series Killing Eve. She was also nominated for Outstanding Guest Actress in a Comedy Series for her performance on Saturday Night Live in 2020.

She also received four Golden Globe Award nominations winning two awards, as well as two Screen Actors Guild Award nominations winning for Outstanding Performance by a Female Actor in a Comedy Series for Fleabag in 2019. For her work on stage she has earned three Laurence Olivier Award nominations. In 2019 she earned Britannia Award for Artist of the Year. She was included in Time Magazine's 100 Most Influential People of 2020.

Major associations

Primetime Emmy Awards

BAFTA Awards

Golden Globe Awards

Screen Actors Guild Awards

Laurence Olivier Awards

Theatre awards

Critics awards

Miscellaneous awards

Special honours

References 

Waller-Bridge, Phoebe